Helen Elizabeth Fisher (born May 31, 1945) is an American anthropologist, human behavior researcher, and self-help author. She is a biological anthropologist, is a senior research fellow, at The Kinsey Institute, Indiana University, and a member of the Center For Human Evolutionary Studies in the Department of Anthropology at Rutgers University. Prior to Rutgers University, she was a research associate at the American Museum of Natural History in New York City.

She is a leading expert on the biology of love and attraction.  Fisher said that when she began researching for her dissertation, she considered the one thing all humans have in common – their reproductive strategies. She is now the most referenced scholar in the love research community. In 2005, she was hired by match.com to help build chemistry.com, which used her research and experience to create both hormone-based and personality-based matching systems. She was one of the main speakers at the 2006 and 2008 TED conference. On January 30, 2009, she was featured in an ABC News 20/20 special, Why Him? Why Her? The Science of Seduction, where she discussed her most recent research on brain chemistry and romantic love.

She appears in the 2014 documentary film about heart-break and loneliness, entitled Sleepless in New York and the 2017 PBS Nova special on computerized dating, 'How to Find Love Online'.

Fisher advises that in order to sustain long-term deep attachment and romantic love, a couple should leverage neurochemistry by regularly having sex and physical contact (which drives up the oxytocin system), engaging in novel activities (which drives up the dopamine system), and saying nice things to the partner (which reduces cortisol and cholesterol).

Early life
Fisher earned a B.A. in Anthropology and Psychology from New York University in 1968; an M.A. in Physical Anthropology, Cultural Anthropology, Linguistics, and Archeology from the University of Colorado at Boulder in 1972, and a Ph.D. in Physical Anthropology: Human Evolution, Primatology, Human Sexual Behavior, and Reproductive Strategies from the University of Colorado at Boulder in 1975.

Research

2004
In her book, Why We Love: The Nature and Chemistry of Romantic Love, Fisher proposed that humanity has evolved three core brain systems for mating and reproduction:

 lust – the sex drive or libido, also described as borogodó.
 attraction – early stage intense romantic love.
 attachment – deep feelings of union with a long term partner.

Love can start with any of these three feelings, Fisher maintains. Some people have sex with someone new and then fall in love.  Some fall in love first, then have sex. Some feel a deep feeling of attachment to another, which then turns into romance and the sex drive.  But the sex drive evolved to initiate mating with a range of partners; romantic love evolved to focus one's mating energy on one partner at a time; and attachment evolved to enable us to form a pair bond and rear young together as a team.

Fisher discusses many of the feelings of intense romantic love, saying it begins as the beloved takes on  "special meaning." Then you focus intensely on him or her.  People can list the things they dislike about a sweetheart, but they sweep these things aside and focus on what they adore. Intense energy, elation, mood swings, emotional dependence, separation anxiety, possessiveness, physical reactions including a pounding heart and shortness of breath, and craving, Fisher reports, are all central to this feeling. But most important is obsessive thinking.  As Fisher says, "Someone is camping in your head."

Fisher and her colleagues studied the brain circuitry of romantic love by fMRI-scanning the brains of forty-nine men and women: seventeen who had just fallen madly in love, fifteen who had just been dumped, and seventeen who reported that they were still in love after an average of twenty-one years of marriage. One of her central ideas is that romantic love is a drive that is stronger than the sex drive. As she has said, "After all, if you casually ask someone to go to bed with you and they refuse, you don't slip into a depression, commit suicide or homicide -- but around the world people suffer terribly from romantic rejection."

Fisher also maintains that taking certain antidepressants can potentially dampen feelings of romantic love and attachment (as well as sex drive).

From the brain scans of people who had just fallen madly in love, Fisher's 2004 book discusses differences between male and female brains.  On average, men tended to show more activity in a brain region associated with the integration of visual stimuli, while women showed more activity in several brain regions linked with memory recall.  Fisher hypothesizes that these differences stem from differing evolutionary forces governing mate choice.  In prehistory (and today), a male was obliged to size up a potential female partner visually to ensure that she is healthy and age-appropriate to bear and rear their potential progeny. But a female could not know from a male's appearance whether he would be a good husband and father; she had to remember his past behaviors, achievements and misadventures—memories which could help her select an effective husband and father for her forthcoming young.

2006
In 2006, her MRI research, which showed that the ventral tegmental area and the caudate nucleus become active when people are in love, was featured in the (February) National Geographic cover-page article, "Love – the Chemical Reaction".

See also
 Keirsey Temperament Sorter
 Interpersonal attraction
 Matchmaking
 Myers–Briggs Type Indicator
 Michael Liebowitz, The Chemistry of Love
 Pepper Schwartz
 Neil Clark Warren

References

Further reading
 
 
 
 
 
 
 Anatomy of Love: A Natural History of Mating, Marriage, and Why We Stray – Illustrated, fully revised and updated, with a new introduction. W. W. Norton & Company, USA. February 1, 2016. .

External links
 
 

1945 births
Living people
Cultural anthropologists
American women anthropologists
American anthropologists
American relationships and sexuality writers
Interpersonal attraction
Rutgers University faculty
People associated with the American Museum of Natural History
Physical anthropologists
New York University alumni
University of Colorado Boulder alumni
American women academics
21st-century American women